The 1983 Federation Cup was the 21st edition of the most important competition between national teams in women's tennis. The tournament was held at the Albisguetli Tennis Club in Zürich, Switzerland from 17 to 24 July. Czechoslovakia won the title, defeating West Germany in the final, in what was the first final since 1972 that didn't involve United States or Australia.

Qualifying round
All ties were played at the Tennisclub Engematt in Zürich on clay courts.

Winning nations advance to Main Draw, losing nations play in Consolation Rounds.

South Korea vs. Jamaica

Israel vs. Chinese Taipei

Denmark vs. Luxembourg

Mexico vs. Ireland

Norway vs. Portugal

China vs. Indonesia

Zimbabwe vs. Philippines

Main draw

1st Round losing teams play in Consolation Rounds

First round

United States vs. Norway

Sweden vs. Belgium

Yugoslavia vs. South Korea

China vs. Netherlands

France vs. Argentina

Zimbabwe vs. Hungary

Italy vs. Austria

Peru vs. Czechoslovakia

Australia vs. Soviet Union

Greece vs. Mexico

Romania vs. Canada

Bulgaria vs. Switzerland

Great Britain vs. Luxembourg

Israel vs. Brazil

Japan vs. Denmark

Spain vs. West Germany

Second round

United States vs. Sweden

Yugoslavia vs. China

Argentina vs. Hungary

Italy vs. Czechoslovakia

Australia vs. Mexico

Romania vs. Switzerland

Great Britain vs. Brazil

Japan vs. West Germany

Quarterfinals

United States vs. Yugoslavia

Argentina vs. Czechoslovakia

Australia vs. Switzerland

Great Britain vs. West Germany

Semifinals

United States vs. Czechoslovakia

Switzerland vs. West Germany

Final

Czechoslovakia vs. West Germany

Consolation Rounds

Draw

First round

Jamaica vs. Indonesia

Bulgaria vs. Zimbabwe

Luxembourg vs. Chinese Taipei

Norway vs. Belgium

Greece vs. Philippines

Ireland vs. South Korea

Second round

Denmark vs. Israel

Netherlands vs. Jamaica

Soviet Union vs. Bulgaria

Canada vs. Chinese Taipei

Belgium vs. Austria

Greece vs. Peru

South Korea vs. France

Spain vs. Portugal

Quarterfinals

Israel vs. Netherlands

Soviet Union vs. Canada

Austria vs. Peru

South Korea vs. Spain

Semifinals

Netherlands vs. Soviet Union

Peru vs. South Korea

Final

Soviet Union vs. Peru

References

Billie Jean King Cups by year
Federation
Tennis tournaments in Switzerland
Sport in Zürich
20th century in Zürich
1983 in women's tennis